Edmond Saglio (9 June 1828 in Paris – 7 December 1911) was a French archaeologist. He was son-in-law to journalist Édouard Charton (1807-1890).

From 1871 to 1893, he worked as a curator at the Louvre, followed by a directorship at the Musée de Cluny (1893-1903). In 1887 he became a member of the Académie des inscriptions et belles-lettres.

With medical historian Charles Victor Daremberg (1817-1872), he was editor of the 10-volume Dictionnaire des Antiquités Grecques et Romaines.

Works about Edmond Saglio 
 "Notice sur la vie et les travaux de M. Edmond Saglio lue dans la séance du 16 mai 1913"        by Ulysse Chevalier, Paris : Firmin Didot, 1913.
 "Notice nécrologique sur Edmond Saglio, membre de l'Institut, membre honoraire de la Société nationale des antiquaires de France (1828-1911)" by Maurice Roy, Impr. Daupeley-Gouverneur, 1926.

References 

1828 births
1911 deaths
Archaeologists from Paris
French curators